is a passenger railway station located in the city of Ōsakasayama, Osaka Prefecture, Japan, operated by the private railway operator Nankai Electric Railway. It has the station number "NK72".

Lines

Layout
The station consists of two ground-level opposed side platforms connected by an underground passage.

Platforms

Adjacent stations

History
Chihayaguchi Station opened on March 11, 1915.

Passenger statistics
In fiscal 2019, the station was used by an average of 216 passengers daily.

Surrounding area
 Amami Post Office

See also
 List of railway stations in Japan

References

External links

 Chihayaguchi Station from Nankai Electric Railway website  

Railway stations in Japan opened in 1915
Railway stations in Osaka Prefecture
Kawachinagano